Ajanbhau may refer to:

Ajanbahu (term), a Sanskrit term
Ajanbahu Lohana, a general of Prithviraj Chauhan
Ajanbahu Jatbasha, an Indian monarch of 16th Century